Chris Brooks is an Australian author, rock, metal and fusion guitarist most noted for his debut instrumental album The Master Plan and his subsequent work with members of Yngwie Malmsteen, Black Sabbath, Lana Lane, and fellow Australians LORD.

Early life

Growing up as one of two sons of a career musician (drummer Ken Brooks), it was not really until he was 11 or 12 that Brooks realised that being a musician could be a career.  He knew his father played the drums and that he was "bloody good at it" and that he did it a lot, but it was not until his own life-altering experiences with music that Brooks realised he could make a living and a lifelong pursuit out of music.

In 1986 John Farnham made a comeback, and Farnham's new band featured Brett Garsed on guitar.  A concert for the "Whispering Jack" album was broadcast on Australian prime-time TV and featured a tune called "Let Me Out", the extended Garsed guitar solo of which Brooks credits as a major turning point in his inspiration to resume playing the guitar.  Brooks cites other early influences as Kee Marcello of the band Europe, Vinnie Moore and Yngwie Malmsteen.

The 1990s and 2000s

Brooks attended the Australian Institute of Music for a certificate course in contemporary music.  During his short time there Brooks was exposed to jazz fusion and began listening to guitar instrumentalists like Frank Gambale, Allan Holdsworth, Pat Metheny and Richie Kotzen.

Demo tapes recorded in the 90s on four-track tapes have since shown up on YouTube, including a cover of the Yngwie Malmsteen track "Black Star", and the original track "I Wonder Why".

On 9 March 2002, Brooks released his debut album The Master Plan, which showcased his guitar chops in dynamic and sometimes complex progressive metal / rock fusion influenced compositions.  The album has (as of January 2009) sold 4,000 copies and gained critical acclaim from artists including Brett Garsed, Vinnie Moore, and Jon Finn.  Press coverage of the album included Metal Hammer magazine (Greece), Burrn! magazine (Japan) and Young Guitar magazine (Japan) as well as numerous fan-maintained progressive rock/metal websites.

In 2003 Brooks joined the Sydney-based melodic rock band Feeding The Addiction.  The band failed to have any success besides a publishing deal with Sony/BMG.  Brooks left the group in 2006 to return to the instrumental guitar genre, beginning with the opening track "Unruly Elements" from the 2007 Liquid Note Records (UK) release "The Alchemists II".  The album also boasted the talents of Brett Garsed, Terry Syrek, Guns N' Roses guitarist Bumblefoot and James LaBrie sideman Marco Sfogli.

In September 2011, the second solo album "The Axis of All Things" was released under the label Axiology Records, a moniker for Brooks' self-released efforts.  The album featured guest appearances from Brett Garsed, Rick Graham, and drummers Peter McDonaugh and Gordon Rytmeister.

In 2017, Brooks signed to publisher Fundamental Changes and released his first book on 17 October entitled "Neoclassical Speed Strategies for Guitar". The book is a biomechanical breakdown of the picking style of guitarist Yngwie Malmsteen.

Guest appearances

In 2002 Brooks wrote and appeared on two songs on the Mark Boals album Edge of the World, which also featured guitarist Tony MacAlpine (Ring of Fire), drummers Virgil Donati and Vinny Appice of Black Sabbath and Dio, and keyboardist Erik Norlander. The album was released by the labels Marquee Inc in Japan and Frontiers Records worldwide.  Brooks also appeared on the Australian metal band LORD's 2007 release Ascendence, on which he contributed guitars to the tracks "Rain" and "Through the Fire".  In 2009 LORD released a new album entitled Set in Stone, which features a new Chris Brooks solo on the track "Be My Guest".

Guitar style and gear

Brooks is renowned for his speed picking and legato technique and melodic phrasing which result in a fluid improvisational style.  Brooks used Ibanez guitars for the first few years of his recording career and has been seen on numerous YouTube videos using a 2004 Paul Reed Smith Custom 24 guitar in vintage Yellow finish, and a customised 1997 American Fender Stratocaster in Teal Green Metallic finish and white pearloid pickguard. In February 2020, Brooks became an endorsing artist for Charvel Guitars.

Discography

The Master Plan (2002)
The Axis of All Things (2011)

Bibliography 

 Neoclassical Speed Strategies for Guitar (2017)
 Sweep Picking Speed Strategies for Guitar (2018)
 Advanced Arpeggio Soloing for Guitar (2018)
 Sweep Picking Speed Strategies for 7-string Guitar (2019)
 Legato Guitar Technique Mastery (2019)
 100 Arpeggio Licks for Shred Guitar (2020)
 The Complete Guitar Technique Speed Strategies Collection (2020)
 Alternate Picking Guitar Technique (August 23, 2021)
 Economy Picking Guitar Technique (November 3, 2021)

References
Citations

Notes

Biography
Interview

External links

Interview at Instrumental Case website

Australian rock guitarists
Living people
Australian heavy metal guitarists
1974 births
Australian Institute of Music alumni
21st-century guitarists